A Gainer is a backward somersault in acrobatics, diving and some martial arts.

Gainer may also refer to:

Related moves
Full gainer
Gainer Flash
Reverse Gainer

Other uses
Gainer (surname)
Gainer (supplement)
Gainer the Gopher, mascot of the Saskatchewan Roughriders
Gainer, a term related to fat fetishism
Overman King Gainer, a Japanese anime